Andrei George Trușescu (born 27 May 1999) is a Romanian professional footballer who plays as a defender for Pandurii Târgu Jiu in the Liga III, on loan from Astra Giurgiu. Trușescu was born in Pitești, Argeș County and grew up at FC Dănuț Coman Football Academy, then played for Roma Primavera before signing its first contract as a professional footballer on 27 August 2018, with Astra Giurgiu.

Honours
Astra Giurgiu
Cupa României: Runner-up 2018–19

Vedița Colonești
Liga III: 2020–21

References

External links
 
 
 Andrei Trușescu at lpf.ro

1999 births
Living people
Sportspeople from Pitești
Romanian footballers
Association football defenders
A.S. Roma players
Liga I players
Liga III players
FC Astra Giurgiu players
CS Pandurii Târgu Jiu players
Romanian expatriate footballers
Romanian expatriate sportspeople in Italy
Expatriate footballers in Italy